Sevi Holmsten (23 August 1921 – 1 July 1993) was a Finnish rower. He competed in the men's single sculls event at the 1952 Summer Olympics.

References

External links
 

1921 births
1993 deaths
Finnish male rowers
Olympic rowers of Finland
Rowers at the 1952 Summer Olympics
People from Pyhtää
Sportspeople from Kymenlaakso